Mohamed Fornah (born November 20, 1987, in Freetown, Sierra Leone) is a Sierra Leonean international footballer who is a defender and is currently playing for Perseta Tulungagung in the Liga Indonesia Premier Division. He is also a member of the Sierra Leone National team. He was a member of the Sierra Under-17 squad that participated at the 2005 Mediterranean Cup in Turkey.

References

External links

Temne people
1987 births
Living people
Ports Authority F.C. players
Sierra Leonean footballers
Sierra Leone international footballers
Association football defenders